Llangynog railway station was the western terminus station of the Tanat Valley Light Railway in Llangynog, Powys, Wales. The station opened in 1904, closed for passengers in 1951 and closed completely in 1952. It had a single platform and a run round loop with sidings serving a goods yard on the north side. The site is now occupied by a caravan park.

References

Further reading

Disused railway stations in Powys
Railway stations in Great Britain opened in 1904
Railway stations in Great Britain closed in 1951
Former Cambrian Railway stations